Ingarodherai is a village in Swat District of Pakistan situated about one kilometre from Mingora city. 

Populated places in Swat District